This article lists the winners and nominees for the Black Reel Award for Television for Outstanding Actress, Drama Series. This category was first introduced in 2017 and won by Rutina Wesley for Queen Sugar. Wesley currently holds the record for most wins with 3  and is currently tied with Dawn-Lyen Gardner for nominations in this category with 4 nominations.

Winners and nominees
Winners are listed first and highlighted in bold.

2010s

2020s

Superlatives

Programs with multiple awards

3 awards
 Queen Sugar

2 awards
 Euphoria

Performers with multiple awards

3 awards
 Rutina Wesley (3 consecutive) 

2 awards
 Zendaya

Programs with multiple nominations

8 nominations
 Queen Sugar

2 nominations
 All Rise
 Claws
 Empire
 Euphoria
 The Equalizer
 How to Get Away With Murder

Performers with multiple nominations

4 nominations
 Dawn-Lyen Gardner
 Rutina Wesley

2 nominations
 Viola Davis
 Taraji P. Henson
 Queen Latifah
 Simone Missick
 Niecy Nash
 Jurnee Smollett
 Zendaya

Total awards by network
 OWN - 3
 HBO - 3

References

Black Reel Awards